The Kent Hotel is a former pub in the inner-western Sydney suburb of Balmain, in the state of New South Wales, Australia.

Workers from the nearby Booth's Saw Mill and later Lever and Kitchen, were regular patrons at the hotel.

The building is now a private residence but retains a sign with the words The Kent on the front veranda as a reminder of its historic past.

Popular culture
The pub was used as the main location for the Australian film Caddie, starring Helen Morse and Jack Thompson. After closing in 1976, the site was reopened for a time as Caddies Restaurant, named after its association with the film.

The hotel is mentioned in the 2014 Man Booker Prize winning novel The Narrow Road to the Deep North.

References

External links

 

Defunct hotels in Sydney
Hotel buildings completed in 1865
Hotels established in 1865
1865 establishments in Australia
Balmain, New South Wales
Former pubs in Australia